Kentucky Route 735 (KY 735) is a  
state highway in southeastern Campbell County, Kentucky, that runs from Kentucky Route 10 at Flagg Spring to Kentucky Route 8 in northern Mentor.

Major intersections

References

0735
0735